Bäk District is situated in the northern part of Khost Province, Afghanistan. It borders  Tere Zayi District to the south, Sabari District to the west, Zazi Maydan District to the north, and Khyber Pakhtunkhwa in Pakistan to the east. According to Afghanistan's National Statistics and Information Authority (NSIA), the 2020 estimated population of the district was 24,977 people. The district center is the village of Bäk, located in the southern part close to the border with Tere Zayi District.

See also
Districts of Afghanistan

References

External links 
AIMS District Map 
Meeting in Bak district [Image 1 of 6] (Defense Visual Information Distribution Service, Jan. 8, 2013)
 (a 30-second video clip, Feb. 3, 2021)

Districts of Khost Province